Léonard-Léopold Forgemol de Bostquénard (1821–1897) was a general in the French Army.

Biography
Léonard-Léopold Forgemol de Bostquénard was born on 17 September 1821 at Azerables, in the Creuse department and died on 28 November 1897 at Versailles.  He graduated from the military school of Saint-Cyr in 1839 and was posted to Algeria in 1840 as an infantry lieutenant, eventually attaining the rank of colonel.  At the start of the Franco-Prussian War, in 1870, he was recalled to France.

Provisionally ranked as a brigadier general on January 30, 1871, he was made up to the permanent position in the following September.  He commanded a subdivision of the department of Aisne with the subsidiary role of secretary of the War Council and in 1878, he was put in military command of the department of Seine-et-Oise.  He was promoted to divisional general on March 4, 1879.  An injury that he received during the war obliged him to wear a large silver plastron over his abdomen.  He was advised to retire, but replied that since he could still sit on a horse, he was still as useful on the battlefield as any other soldier.

In 1881, he was in command of the army for the region of Constantine, Algeria. He was ordered by the government of Jules Ferry to direct the military operations in Tunisia from April to July 1881.  They resulted in the establishment of the French protectorate under the treaties of Bardo and Marsa in 1883.  He remained in Tunisia up until 1883 and oversaw a second campaign of "pacification" in the region of Kairouan.  On his return to Paris, he became a staff-officer at the war ministry.  He was awarded the Legion of Honour, on May 4, 1889 and received the French military medal in 1894.  He was named as Commandant of the 11th Army Corps from 1889, until his retirement in 1894.

A commemorative plate was fixed to the wall of his modest family home at Azérables.  It includes the name of his brother John Jacques Hector (1819–1883), military surgeon and also a member of the Légion d’honneur.

Bibliography 
Paul Henri Benjamin d' Estournelles de Constant, La politique francaise en Tunisie: le protectorat et ses origines (1854-1891), Paris : Plon, Nourrit, 1891.

Sources 
Gen. de Bostquénard dead, The New York Times, 30 novembre 1897.
Military biography and photograph
This article is based on the equivalent article from the French Wikipedia, consulted on December 31, 2007.

Notes 

French generals
Grand Croix of the Légion d'honneur
1821 births
1897 deaths